James Alexander Louttit (October 16, 1848 – July 26, 1906) was an American lawyer and politician who served as a U.S. Representative from California from 1885 to 1887.

Biography 
Born in New Orleans, Louisiana, in 1849 he moved to California with his parents, who settled in Calaveras County. He attended private and public schools and the State normal school at Sacramento. He studied law and was admitted to the bar in 1869. He settled in Stockton, California, in 1871 and practiced law - he was prosecuting attorney of Stockton 1871–1879.

Congressman Louttit helped to found a Public Library in Lodi in 1885.

He was elected as a Republican to the Forty-ninth Congress (March 4, 1885 – March 3, 1887). He was not a candidate for renomination in 1886, and resumed the practice of law in Stockton. He died in Pacific Grove, California on July 26, 1906, and was interred in the Stockton Rural Cemetery.

References

1848 births
1906 deaths
Republican Party members of the United States House of Representatives from California
Politicians from Stockton, California
19th-century American politicians